The  is a third-sector railway operating company in Japan. The Tsukuba Express line was opened on 24 August 2005.

Shareholders
As of 2019, the company is owned by the following local governments and municipalities.

References

External links

 

Railway companies of Japan
Japanese companies established in 1991
Railway companies established in 1991
Akihabara